The Pagotto Brako is an Italian ultralight trike, designed by Enio Pagotto and produced by Carpenterie Pagotto of Pianzano. The aircraft is supplied as a complete ready-to-fly-aircraft.

Design and development
It features a cable-braced hang glider-style high wing, weight-shift controls, a two-seats-in-tandem open cockpit without a cockpit fairing, tricycle landing gear with wheel pants and a single engine in pusher configuration.

The aircraft is made from welded stainless steel tubing, with its single or double surface wing covered in Dacron sailcloth. The Brako is factory supplied only with Grif wings. The wing is supported by a single tube-type kingpost and uses an "A" frame weight-shift control bar. The powerplant is a twin-cylinder, air-cooled, two-stroke, dual-ignition  Rotax 503 engine, with a reconditioned four-cylinder, air- and liquid-cooled, four-stroke, dual-ignition  Rotax 912UL engine optional.

Specifications (Brako with Grif Trainer wing)

References

External links

2000s Italian sport aircraft
2000s Italian ultralight aircraft
Single-engined pusher aircraft
Ultralight trikes